William Woodman may refer to:
 William Robert Woodman, co-founder of the Hermetic Order of the Golden Dawn
 William W. Woodman, American politician in Wisconsin

See also
 William Woodman Graham, British mountaineer